Alena Stolzová (born 6 November 1937) is a Czech sprinter. She competed for Czechoslovakia in the women's 200 metres at the 1960 Summer Olympics.

References

External links
 
 

1937 births
Living people
Athletes (track and field) at the 1960 Summer Olympics
Czech female sprinters
Czech female hurdlers
Olympic athletes of Czechoslovakia
Place of birth missing (living people)